Crispy fried chicken is a standard dish in the Cantonese cuisine of southern China and Hong Kong. The chicken is fried in such a way that the skin is extremely crunchy, but the white meat is relatively soft. This is done by first poaching the chicken in water with spices (e.g. star anise, cinnamon, nutmeg, Sichuan pepper, ginger, fennel, and scallions), drying it, coating with a syrup of vinegar and sugar, letting it dry thoroughly (which helps make the skin crispy) and deep-frying.

The dish is often served with two side dishes, a pepper salt and prawn crackers. The pepper salt, colored dark white to gray, is dry-fried separately in a wok. It is made of salt and Sichuan pepper.

Traditionally this dish is eaten at night. It is also one of the traditional chicken dishes served at Chinese weddings and other Asian weddings.

See also
 Chicken fingers
 Chicken fries
 Chicken nugget
 Fried chicken
 Korean fried chicken
 List of chicken dishes
 White cut chicken

References

Cantonese cuisine
Hong Kong cuisine
Chinese chicken dishes
Deep fried foods
Fried chicken